Saint Hilda's Collegiate School is a secondary school for girls in Dunedin, New Zealand.

History 
Founded as an Anglican school in 1896 by the first bishop of Dunedin, Bishop Samuel Nevill and staffed by the Sisters of the Church. The sisters withdrew from the school in the 1930s. St Hilda's is the only school of the Anglican Diocese of Dunedin. It is integrated into the New Zealand state school system.

It has a roll of approximately 450 girls with around one third of the school being boarders from both around New Zealand and overseas. The school is named after Saint Hilda, a 7th-century English abbess remembered for the influential role she played in the Synod of Whitby. Saint Hilda is considered one of the patron saints of learning and culture, including poetry.

Occupying a site bounded by Cobden Street, Heriot Row and Royal Terrace, the original buildings have been demolished and the site redeveloped from the mid 20th century. Some of the new buildings were designed by Ted McCoy. The chapel includes copies of windows from the first chapel.

Notable alumni and staff 
 Fiona J. McDonald, graduate
 Bessie Te Wenerau Grace, staff

Louise Petherbridge - actor and director

References

External links

Girls' schools in New Zealand
Boarding schools in New Zealand
Secondary schools in Dunedin
Educational institutions established in 1896
1896 establishments in New Zealand
Alliance of Girls' Schools Australasia